Omar Alexander Hinestroza González (born June 27, 1994 in Colon, Panama) is a professional Panamanian footballer who currently plays for Correcaminos UAT.

References

External links
 

Living people
1994 births
Panamanian footballers
Panamanian expatriate footballers
Association football forwards
Correcaminos UAT footballers
Unión Deportivo Universitario players
Tauro F.C. players
Ascenso MX players
Liga Panameña de Fútbol players
Panamanian expatriate sportspeople in Mexico
Expatriate footballers in Mexico